'MONOKUL' is a Japanese songwriting duo consisting of Sara Yoshida and Ryuta Tsunoda. His record company is gr8!records.

Members 
 Sara Yoshida - Vocal, lyrics, composition and arrangement
 Ryuta Tsunoda - Bass, lyrics, composition and arrangement - singer, drummer Tsunoda ☆ Hiro is his uncle.

Overview 
Formed in 2011 by Yoshida and Tsunoda, who were active as jazz musicians. After releasing the 1st mini-album as an indie, Kikuchi Naruyoshi produced. Released 4th album with self-produced at the beginning of 2018.

The origin of the band name is Tsunoda, who heard that there was a magazine called "Monkuru" supervised by Juzo Itami, and liked the sound of the word rather than the meaning of the word itself. Itami's "Mononkuru" itself seems to have come from "Mon Oncle (My uncle)" because there is also a work with the same name.

Provenance 

Source:
 2011
 Released mini-album "SARA"
 Formation of Monkuru in January
 year 2012
 First solo performance held at MotionBlueYokohama
 2013
 1st album "Flying Things, Crawling Things, Singing Things" 
 Solo performance from record held at Aoyama CAY
 Appeared at JAZZ AUDITORIA 2013 sponsored by BlueNote Japan
 2014
 2nd album "Minami e" released
 Jazz Japan Disc Award '14 Rookie of the Year Award
 2nd Season Tour held
 2015
 FUJI ROCK FESTIVAL '15 Appearance
 Solo performance from record held at Kinema Club
 TOUR held to the south
 Appeared in Earth Garden '15 Fall
 JAZZ SUMMIT TOKYO SUMMER FESTIVAL Appearance
 2016
 Solo performance held at Marunouchi COTTON CLUB
 SUNNYSIDE TOUR 2016 held
 Appearance at KAWASAKI JAZZ 2016
 2017
 Solo performance held at Daikanyama UNIT
 Held a tour where you can hear the world only here
 3rdAlbum "Tell me that the world is only here"  is jazz on various distribution charts such as iTunes, Apple Music, Spotify Won 1st place in the category
 Kikuchi Naruyoshi Directed work "Tell me it's only here" MV released
 Distribution limited single "Mahou ga Toketara" distribution start 
 2018
 Produced album "RELOADING CITY" released
 Succeeded in a one-man live from a record at Ebisu Liquid Room and a solo performance at BLUE NOTE TOKYO.
 2019
 Digital release of "Super Looper", the image song for craft beer "Wednesday Neko"
 Her self-planned event "Mon Japonismo" was held at Shibuya WWW with Emi Nakamura as guest for the first time and tofubeats for the second time. 
 2020
On July 8, a non-audience live “J-WAVE Sponsored Monkuru LIVE FROM NIHONMONO LOUNGE” will be held.
 Citizen's cross-sea commercial song "Every One Minute" was released digitally, and the notation was changed to katakana.
 2021
"Billboard Live Tokyo Performance" on March 12, "Billboard Live Yokohama Performance" on June 27, and "Billboard Live Osaka Performance" on July 16.
On March 3, digital release of "Hold On Me!" (Morning Musume. cover).
 Digital release of "GOODBYE" on May 19.
On June 23, digital release of "Oto no Narumaida".
 Digital release of "Zuruiyo" on August 4.
2022
January 15 Digital release of the ending theme "salvation Anime ver."
"salvation" CD release on February 23.
On March 10, a one-man live "Mononcle "salvation" RELEASE PARTY" was held at WWW X in Shibuya.
On May 11, SONY Xperia 1IV commercial song "Higher" was released digitally.

Discography

Album

Singles

References

External links
 
 

Official interview
Official interview 2

Japanese songwriters